Lightvessels in Ireland describes any lightvessel or light float previously stationed off the coast of Ireland. The Commissioners of Irish Lights are responsible for the majority of marine navigation aids around the whole of the island of Ireland.

Lightvessels

 Guillemot: built 1921/23 – sold 1968 – set in concrete as the Kilmore Quay Maritime Museum retains much original equipment and fittings. Scrapped during 2011. http://www.wexfordcameraclub.com/cgi-bin/yabb2/YaBB.pl?num=1300478453 
 Kittiwake: built 1955 – Currently sold and docked in Dublin. There is a superbuoy in its place. It was removed from station in 2009.
 Osprey:  built 1953/55 – sold 1975 – now known as Le Batofar, a nightclub/pub moored on the Seine in Paris
 Petrel: built 1913/15 – sold 1968 – club house for Down Cruising Club in Ballydorn
 Puffin Lightvessel, Roche's Point, Cork – washed away in 1896

Lightvessel stations
 Coningbeg, off the Saltee Islands, 14 km from the County Wexford coast, was established in 1824 and replaced on 26 February 2007 with a "Superbuoy"

See also
 Lighthouses in Ireland
 Lightvessel stations of Great Britain
 List of lightvessels of Great Britain
 List of lighthouses and lightvessels

Gallery

References

External links
 Lightships in the Commissioners of Irish Lights service
 Lightships from all over the world 

 
Lightships
Ireland
Ireland transport-related lists
Water transport in Ireland